Karl Raoul Persson (22 August 1889 – 13 April 1979) was a Swedish footballer who played for Uppsala and Sandvikens. He was capped twice for the Sweden national football team in 1911 and 1912, scoring three goals.

Career statistics

International

International goals
Scores and results list Sweden's goal tally first.

References

1889 births
1979 deaths
Swedish footballers
Sweden international footballers
Association football forwards
Sandvikens AIK Fotboll players
People from Sandviken Municipality
Sportspeople from Gävleborg County